Iniyaval Urangatte is a 1978 Indian Malayalam film,  directed by K. G. George. The film stars Sukumaran and Anuradha in the lead role. The film has musical score by M. K. Arjunan.

Cast
Sukumaran
Anuradha

Soundtrack
The music was composed by M. K. Arjunan and the lyrics were written by Poovachal Khader.

References

External links
 

1978 films
1970s Malayalam-language films
Films directed by K. G. George